"This Town" is the debut solo single by Irish singer Niall Horan, released on 29 September 2016 by Capitol Records as the lead single from his debut solo album Flicker (2017). An accompanying music video of a live performance was released the same day. The song was written by Horan, Jamie Scott, Mike Needle, Daniel Bryer, Ruairi Sheridan, Aodhán Dorrian and produced by Greg Kurstin. It is Horan's first solo single, as well as the second solo single released by any of One Direction's remaining members (the first being Zayn Malik's Pillowtalk earlier that year), following the hiatus of the band, which was announced earlier in 2016. It peaked at number 9 on the UK Singles Chart, earning it his second highest-charting single as a lead artist to date, behind "Slow Hands". It also peaked at number 20 on the US Billboard Hot 100.

Composition
The song is written in the key of A major with a common time tempo of 112 beats per minute. Horan's vocals span from D3 to E4 in the song. The acoustic track reflects on the things the singer never got to say to a lost lover.

Critical reception
Harriet Gibsone from The Guardian thought Horan's "This Town" "promotes his guise as an acoustic balladeer," while the video is "reinforcing the authenticity of his future career as a credible artist with skills beyond being adorable." She concluded "The modern music world can be discombobulating for those opposed to gender fluid pop stars or auto-tuned trap." Entertainment Weekly editor Madison Vain wrote "the song shows growth thanks to its nuance in storytelling. He’s burdened by all the things he never got to say—and it sounds believable." Vain also thought "Horan has said he’s mining the sound of some of his biggest influences: Bob Dylan and Simon & Garfunkel. But with collaborator Greg Kurstin behind the boards, “This Town” skews more towards the modern, folk-influenced songwriting of Vance Joy and Ed Sheeran." For Raisa Bruner of Time is a "lush, guitar-forward ballad in the vein of the band’s earlier tearjerkers, with hints of Sheeran in the small-town storytelling of the lyrics." For Noisey, Sarah Sahim was critical of the track, noting the song was "nothing special", but its saccharine sweetness gives it all the makings of a decent hit.

Live performances
Horan gave the first televised performance of "This Town" on The Graham Norton Show on 22 October 2016. On 26 October 2016 he performed on The Ellen DeGeneres Show. Later that day, he appeared on The Late Late Show with James Corden to sing the single. On 13 December 2016, he performed on The Tonight Show Starring Jimmy Fallon. He also performed the song at the Radio 1 Teen Awards, and the American Music Awards. In December, he made guest appearances across North America as part of iHeartRadio's Jingle Ball Tour.

On 4 June 2017, Horan performed "This Town" during the One Love Manchester benefit concert for the victims of the Manchester Arena bombing after Ariana Grande's show.

Track listings
Digital download
 "This Town" – 3:52

Digital download – live
 "This Town" (Live, 1 Mic 1 Take) – 3:52

Remixes EP
 "This Town" (Tiësto Remix) – 3:01
 "This Town" (Cheat Codes Remix) – 3:21
 "This Town" (Goldhouse Remix) – 4:00
 "This Town" (Cabo San Remix) – 4:04
 "This Town" (Nikö Blank Remix) – 3:28

Charts

Weekly charts

Year-end charts

Certifications

Release history

References

External links

2016 debut singles
2016 songs
Niall Horan songs
Song recordings produced by Greg Kurstin
Songs written by Niall Horan
Songs written by Jamie Scott
Capitol Records singles
Folk ballads
2010s ballads
Songs written by Dan Bryer
Songs written by Mike Needle